I Like It Like That may refer to:

Film
I Like It Like That (film), a 1994 film starring Lauren Vélez and Jon Seda

Music

Albums
I Like It Like That (album), a 1964 album by the Miracles
I Like It Like That, a 1997 album by Tito Nieves

Songs
"I Like It Like That" (Chris Kenner song), Chris Kenner & Allen Toussaint (1961),  covered by the Dave Clark Five, The Nashville Teens, Loggins and Messina	
"I Like It Like That" (The Miracles song), Robinson & Tarplin (1964)
"I Like It Like That" (Pete Rodriguez song), a 1967 song first sung by Pete Rodriguez, subsequently rendered by the Blackout All-Stars and other artists
"I Like It Like That" (Per Gessle song) (2006)
"I Like It Like That" (Hot Chelle Rae song) (2011)
"I Like It Like That", a 1965 Van Morrison song by Them on The Angry Young Them

See also
Like It Like That (disambiguation)
I Like It (disambiguation)